Pandolfo II Malatesta (1325 – January 1373) was an Italian condottiero.

The son of Malatesta II Malatesta, he fought under Werner von Urslingen and Gil de Albornoz. Later served Galeazzo II Visconti of Milan, but raised the jealousy of Bernabò Visconti and fled to the Marche. Later held a condotta for Florence against Pisa and fought against John Hawkwood.

He died in Pesaro.

References
P. J. Jones. The Malatesta of Rimini and the Papal State. Cambridge University Press, 2005

1325 births
1373 deaths
Pandolfo 2
Malatesta, Pandolfo 2